Between Sea and Land is a 2016 Colombian drama film directed by Manolo Cruz and Carlos del Castillo. It was shown in the World Cinema Dramatic Competition section at the 2016 Sundance Film Festival and won the World Cinema Dramatic Special Jury Award for Acting (for Vicky Hernández and Manolo Cruz) and the World Cinema Audience Award: Dramatic.

Cast
 Jorge Cao
 Manolo Cruz
 Vicky Hernández
 Viviana Serna
 Mile Vergara

References

External links
 

2016 films
2016 drama films
2010s Spanish-language films
Colombian drama films
2010s Colombian films